''Bedotia'' sp. nov. 'Sambava' is a species of fish in the Bedotiidae family. It is endemic to Madagascar.  Its natural habitat is rivers. It is threatened by habitat loss.

References

Bedotia
Freshwater fish of Madagascar
Undescribed vertebrate species
Taxonomy articles created by Polbot